The Snoopy Museum Tokyo  is a temporary museum in the city of Machida, Tokyo about Snoopy.

History

The museum opened on 23 April 2016 in Roppongi, Minato, Tokyo and attracted almost a million visitors for the next two years. It closed its doors in 2018, the year which also marked the 50th anniversary of Peanuts being first introduced in Japan, after its final exhibition (21 April to 24 September 2018).

On 14 December 2019, the museum reopened in Machida, Tokyo.

Facilities
The museum features a store named Brown's Store and Cafe Blanket.

Transportation
The museum is accessible within walking distance north of Azabu-juban Station of Tokyo Metro.

See also
 List of museums in Tokyo

References

External links

 

2016 establishments in Japan
Museums established in 2016
Museums in Tokyo